Sphaerocoris is a genus of shield-backed bugs belonging to the family Scutelleridae.

Species
 Sphaerocoris annulus Fabr.
 Sphaerocoris argus Stal 
 Sphaerocoris bipustulatus  
 Sphaerocoris circuliferus Walker 1867  
 Sphaerocoris impluviatus Germar 1839
 Sphaerocoris lateritia Westwood in F. W. Hope 1837  
 Sphaerocoris misella Stal  
 Sphaerocoris ocellatus Klug in H. Burmeister 1835  
 Sphaerocoris polysticta Westwood in F. W. Hope 1837  
 Sphaerocoris punctaria Westwood. in F. W. Hope 1837  
 Sphaerocoris quadrinotata Westwood in F. W. Hope 1837  
 Sphaerocoris rusticus (Fab.)  
 Sphaerocoris simplex Herrich-S. 1836  
 Sphaerocoris subnotatus Walker 1868  
 Sphaerocoris testudogrisea De Geer  
 Sphaerocoris tigrinus Germar 1839  
 Sphaerocoris unicolor Dall.

References

Scutelleridae